The Rocas Atoll is the only atoll in the South Atlantic Ocean. It belongs to the Brazilian State of Rio Grande do Norte. The atoll is of volcanic origin and coralline formation.

Description

Farol Cay accounts for almost two-thirds of the aggregate area. Both islets are overgrown with grasses, bushes and a few palm trees. The population consists of crabs, spiders, scorpions, sand fleas, beetles, large roaches, and many species of birds.

There is a lighthouse of the Brazilian Navy that has been in operation and maintained since the 1960s, at the Northern end of Farol Bay. In its vicinity is a derelict lighthouse from 1933.

The atoll is a wildlife sanctuary, and in 2001 was designated by UNESCO as a World Heritage Site because of its importance as a feeding ground for marine life. Numerous turtles, sharks, dolphins and birds live in the area. The atoll consists mainly of coral and red algae.

The atoll and surrounding waters are contained in the Atol das Rocas Biological Reserve. The reserve it is currently used solely for scientific research. Due to their remote location, the islands remain largely undisturbed by human activities. On the other hand, the remoteness also limits researchers' access to the islands and few studies have been developed on this atoll. The entomological fauna from Atol das Rocas have been recorded.

In popular culture
The atoll was the site of a missile attack on a Cobra satellite communications tracking station and robotics storage center, in the G.I. Joe comic title from Marvel Comics.

See also
 Atoll
 List of islands of Brazil

References

External links
 Sigep - Brazilian Commission of Geological and Palaeobiological Sites Description with maps and pictures  - 
 UNESCO - World Heritage 
 Further information 
 Atol das Rocas on Globo.com 

Atolls of Brazil
Islands of the South Atlantic Ocean
Landforms of Rio Grande do Norte
Environment of Rio Grande do Norte
Uninhabited islands of Brazil
World Heritage Sites in Brazil